Hungary competed at the 1968 Summer Olympics in Mexico City, Mexico. 167 competitors, 135 men and 32 women, took part in 116 events in 15 sports.

Medalists

Gold
Gyula Zsivótzky — Athletics, Men's Hammer Throw
Angéla Németh — Athletics, Women's Javelin Throw 
Mihály Hesz — Canoeing, Men's K1 1.000m Kayak Singles 
Tibor Tatai — Canoeing, Men's C1 1.000m Canadian Singles 
Győző Kulcsár — Fencing, Men's Épée Individual
Csaba Fenyvesi, Győző Kulcsár, Pál Nagy, Zoltán Nemere, and Pál Schmitt — Fencing, Men's Épée Team 
András Balczó, István Móna, and Ferenc Török — Modern Pentathlon, Men's Team Competition
István Básti, Antal Dunai, Lajos Dunai, Károly Fatér, László Fazekas, István Juhász, László Keglovich, Lajos Kocsis, Iván Menczel, László Nagy, Ernő Noskó, Dezső Novák, Miklós Páncsics, István Sárközi, Miklós Szalay, Zoltán Szarka, and Lajos Szűcs — Football (soccer), Men's Team Competition
János Varga — Wrestling, Men's Greco-Roman Bantamweight
István Kozma — Wrestling, Men's Greco-Roman Heavyweight

Silver
Antal Kiss — Athletics, Men's 50 km Walk
Csaba Giczy and István Timár — Canoeing, Men's K2 1.000m Kayak Pairs (Men) 
Gyula Petrikovics and Tamás Wichmann — Canoeing, Men's C2 1.000m Canadian Pairs 
Anna Pfeffer and Katalin Rozsnyói — Canoeing, Women's K2 500m Kayak Pairs
Jenő Kamuti — Fencing, Men's Foil Individual
Ildikó Bóbis, Paula Marosi, Mária Gulácsy, Lídia Dömölky, and Ildikó Rejtő — Fencing, Women's Foil Team 
András Balczó — Modern Pentathlon, Men's Individual Competition
József Csermely, Antal Melis, Zoltán Melis, and György Sarlós — Rowing, Men's Coxless Fours 
László Hammerl — Shooting, Men's Small-bore Rifle, prone 
Imre Földi — Weightlifting, Men's Bantamweight

Bronze
Lázár Lovász — Athletics, Men's Hammer Throw
Gergely Kulcsár — Athletics, Men's Javelin Throw 
Jolán Kleiber-Kontsek — Athletics, Women's Discus Throw 
Annamária Kovács — Athletics, Women's Pentathlon 
István Csizmadia, Csaba Giczy, Imre Szőllősi, and István Tímár — Canoeing, Men's K2 K4 1.000m Kayak Fours 
Tibor Pézsa — Fencing, Men's Sabre Individual
Péter Bakonyi, János Kalmár, Tamás Kovács, Miklós Meszéna, and Tibor Pézsa — Fencing, Men's Sabre Team 
Ildikó Rejtő — Fencing, Women's Foil Individual 
Károly Bakos — Weightlifting, Men's Middleweight
 András Bodnár, Zoltán Dömötör, László Felkai, Ferenc Konrád III, János Konrád II, Mihály Mayer, László Sárosi, János Steinmetz, Endre Molnár, Dénes Pácsik and István Szívós Jr. — Water Polo, Men's Team Competition
Károly Bajkó — Wrestling, Men's Greco-Roman Welterweight
József Csatári — Wrestling, Men's Freestyle Light Heavyweight

Athletics

Boxing

Canoeing

Cycling

Seven cyclists represented Hungary in 1968.

Individual road race
 Imre Géra
 Ferenc Keserű
 András Takács
 Tibor Magyar

Team time trial
 András Takács
 András Mészáros
 Imre Géra
 Tibor Magyar

Sprint
 András Baranyecz

1000m time trial
 Tibor Lendvai

Tandem
 András Baranyecz
 Tibor Lendvai

Fencing

20 fencers, 15 men and 5 women, represented Hungary in 1968.

Men's foil
 Jenő Kamuti
 Sándor Szabó
 László Kamuti

Men's team foil
 Sándor Szabó, Jenő Kamuti, László Kamuti, Gábor Füredi, Attila May

Men's épée
 Győző Kulcsár
 Csaba Fenyvesi
 Zoltán Nemere

Men's team épée
 Zoltán Nemere, Győző Kulcsár, Pál B. Nagy, Csaba Fenyvesi, Pál Schmitt

Men's sabre
 Tibor Pézsa
 Tamás Kovács
 Péter Bakonyi

Men's team sabre
 Tibor Pézsa, Miklós Meszéna, János Kalmár, Péter Bakonyi, Tamás Kovács

Women's foil
 Ildikó Ságiné Ujlakyné Rejtő, Lídia Sákovicsné Dömölky, Ildikó Farkasinszky-Bóbis

Women's team foil
 Ildikó Ságiné Ujlakyné Rejtő, Ildikó Farkasinszky-Bóbis, Paula Marosi, Lídia Sákovicsné Dömölky, Mária Gulácsy

Football

Gymnastics

Modern pentathlon

Three male pentathletes represented Hungary in 1968. They won gold in the team event and András Balczó won a silver in the individual event.

Individual
 András Balczó
 István Móna
 Ferenc Török

Team
 András Balczó
 István Móna
 Ferenc Török

Rowing

Sailing

Shooting

Six shooters, all men, represented Hungary in 1968.

25 m pistol
 Aladár Dobsa
 Szilárd Kun

50 m pistol
 László Mucza

300 m rifle, three positions
 Lajos Papp
 Ferenc Petrovácz

50 m rifle, three positions
 László Hammerl
 Ferenc Petrovácz

50 m rifle, prone
 László Hammerl
 Lajos Papp

Swimming

Water polo

Men's Team Competition
Preliminary Round (Group A)
 Defeated West Germany (6:4)
 Defeated Spain (7:1)
 Defeated United States (5:1)
 Defeated Soviet Union (6:5)
 Defeated Brazil (8:2)
 Defeated Cuba (7:1)
Semifinals
 Lost to Yugoslavia (6:8)
Bronze Medal Match
 Defeated Italy (9:4) →  Bronze Medal

Team Roster
Mihály Mayer
András Bodnár
Zoltán Dömötör
László Felkai
Ferenc Konrád
János Konrád
Endre Molnár
Dénes Pócsik
László Sárosi
János Steinmetz
István Szívós Jr.

Weightlifting

Wrestling

References

External links
Official Olympic Reports
International Olympic Committee results database

Nations at the 1968 Summer Olympics
1968
Olympics